In classical Freudian psychoanalytic theory, the death drive is the drive toward death and destruction, often expressed through behaviors such as aggression, repetition compulsion, and self-destructiveness. It was originally proposed by Sabina Spielrein in her paper "Destruction as the Cause of Coming Into Being" (Die Destruktion als Ursache des Werdens) in 1912, which was then taken up by Sigmund Freud in 1920 in Beyond the Pleasure Principle. This concept has been translated as "opposition between the ego or death instincts and the sexual or life instincts". In Pleasure Principle, Freud used the plural "death drives" (Todestriebe) much more frequently than the singular.

The death drive opposes Eros, the tendency toward survival, propagation, sex, and other creative, life-producing drives. The death drive is sometimes referred to as "Thanatos" in post-Freudian thought, complementing "Eros", although this term was not used in Freud's own work, being rather introduced by Wilhelm Stekel in 1909 and then by Paul Federn in the present context. Subsequent psychoanalysts such as Jacques Lacan and Melanie Klein have defended the concept.

Terminology
The standard edition of Freud's works in English confuses two terms that are different in German, Instinkt (instinct) and Trieb (drive), often translating both as instinct; for example, "the hypothesis of a death instinct, the task of which is to lead organic life back into the inanimate state". "This equating of Instinkt and Trieb has created serious misunderstandings". Freud actually refers to the term "Instinkt" in explicit use elsewhere, and so while the concept of "instinct" can loosely be referred to as a "drive," any essentialist or naturalist connotations of the term should be put in abeyance. In a sense, the death drive is a force that is not essential to the life of an organism (unlike an "instinct") and tends to denature it or make it behave in ways that are sometimes counter-intuitive. In other words, the term death "instinct" is simply a false representation of death drive. The term is almost universally known in scholarly literature on Freud as the "death drive", and Lacanian psychoanalysts often shorten it to simply "drive" (although Freud posited the existence of other drives as well, and Lacan explicitly states in Seminar XI that all drives are partial to the death drive). The contemporary Penguin translations of Freud translate Trieb and Instinkt as "drive" and "instinct" respectively.

Origin of the theory: Beyond the Pleasure Principle

It was a basic premise of Freud's that "the course taken by mental events is automatically regulated by the pleasure principle...[associated] with an avoidance of unpleasure or a production of pleasure". Three main types of conflictual evidence, difficult to explain satisfactorily in such terms, led Freud late in his career to look for another principle in mental life beyond the pleasure principle—a search that would ultimately lead him to the concept of the death drive.

The first problem Freud encountered was the phenomenon of repetition in (war) trauma. When Freud worked with people with trauma (particularly the trauma experienced by soldiers returning from World War I), he observed that subjects often tended to repeat or re-enact these traumatic experiences: "dreams occurring in traumatic patients have the characteristic of repeatedly bringing the patient back into the situation of his accident", contrary to the expectations of the pleasure principle.

A second problematic area was found by Freud in children's play (such as the Fort/Da  Forth/here game played by Freud's grandson, who would stage and re-stage the disappearance of his mother and even himself). "How then does his repetition of this distressing experience as a game fit in with the pleasure principle?"

The third problem came from clinical practice. Freud found his patients, dealing with painful experiences that had been repressed, regularly "obliged to repeat the repressed material as a contemporary experience instead of ... remembering it as something belonging to the past". Combined with what he called "the compulsion of destiny ... come across [in] people all of whose human relationships have the same outcome", such evidence led Freud "to justify the hypothesis of a compulsion to repeat—something that would seem more primitive, more elementary, more instinctual than the pleasure principle which it over-rides".

He then set out to find an explanation of such a compulsion, an explanation that some scholars have labeled as "metaphysical biology". In Freud's own words, "What follows is speculation, often far-fetched speculation, which the reader will consider or dismiss according to his individual predilection". Seeking a new instinctual paradigm for such problematic repetition, he found it ultimately in "an urge in organic life to restore an earlier state of things"—the inorganic state from which life originally emerged. From the conservative, restorative character of instinctual life, Freud derived his death drive, with its "pressure towards death", and the resulting "separation of the death instincts from the life instincts" seen in Eros. The death drive then manifested itself in the individual creature as a force "whose function is to assure that the organism shall follow its own path to death".

Seeking further potential clinical support for the existence of such a self-destructive force, Freud found it through a reconsideration of his views of masochism—previously "regarded as sadism that has been turned round upon the subject's own ego"—so as to allow that "there might be such a thing as primary masochism—a possibility which I had contested" before. Even with such support, however, he remained very tentative to the book's close about the provisional nature of his theoretical construct: what he called "the whole of our artificial structure of hypotheses".

Although Spielrein's paper was published in 1912, Freud initially resisted the concept as he considered it to be too Jungian. Nevertheless, Freud eventually adopted the concept, and in later years would build extensively upon the tentative foundations he had set out in Beyond the Pleasure Principle. In The Ego and the Id (1923) he would develop his argument to state that "the death instinct would thus seem to express itself—though probably only in part—as an instinct of destruction directed against the external world". The following year he would spell out more clearly that the "libido has the task of making the destroying instinct innocuous, and it fulfils the task by diverting that instinct to a great extent outwards .... The instinct is then called the destructive instinct, the instinct for mastery, or the will to power", a perhaps much more recognisable set of manifestations.

At the close of the decade, in Civilization and Its Discontents (1930), Freud acknowledged that "To begin with it was only tentatively that I put forward the views I have developed here, but in the course of time they have gained such a hold upon me that I can no longer think in any other way".

Philosophy

From a philosophical perspective, the death drive may be viewed in relation to the work of the German philosopher Arthur Schopenhauer. His philosophy, expounded in The World as Will and Representation (1818) postulates that all exists by a metaphysical "will" (more clearly, a will to live), and that pleasure affirms this will. Schopenhauer's pessimism led him to believe that the affirmation of the "will" was a negative and immoral thing, due to his belief of life producing more suffering than happiness. The death drive would seem to manifest as a natural and psychological negation of the "will".

Freud was well aware of such possible linkages. In a letter of 1919, he wrote that regarding "the theme of death, [that I] have stumbled onto an odd idea via the drives and must now read all sorts of things that belong to it, for instance Schopenhauer". Ernest Jones (who like many analysts was not convinced of the need for the death drive, over and above an instinct of aggression) considered that "Freud seemed to have landed in the position of Schopenhauer, who taught that 'death is the goal of life'".

However, as Freud put it to the imagined auditors of his New Introductory Lectures (1932), "You may perhaps shrug your shoulders and say: "That isn't natural science, it's Schopenhauer's philosophy!" But, ladies and gentlemen, why should not a bold thinker have guessed something that is afterwards confirmed by sober and painstaking detailed research?" He then went on to add that "what we are saying is not even genuine Schopenhauer....we are not overlooking the fact that there is life as well as death. We recognise two basic instincts and give each of them its own aim".

Cultural application: Civilization and Its Discontents

Freud applied his new theoretical construct in Civilization and Its Discontents (1930) to the difficulties inherent in Western civilization—indeed, in civilization and in social life as a whole. In particular, given that "a portion of the [death] instinct is diverted towards the external world and comes to light as an instinct of aggressiveness', he saw 'the inclination to aggression ... [as] the greatest impediment to civilization". The need to overcome such aggression entailed the formation of the [cultural] superego: "We have even been guilty of the heresy of attributing the origin of conscience to this diversion inwards of aggressiveness". The presence thereafter in the individual of the superego and a related sense of guilt—"Civilization, therefore, obtains mastery over the individual's dangerous desire for aggression by ... setting up an agency within him to watch over it"—leaves an abiding sense of uneasiness inherent in civilized life, thereby providing a structural explanation for 'the suffering of civilized man'.

Freud made a further connection between group life and innate aggression, where the former comes together more closely by directing aggression to other groups, an idea later picked up by group analysts like Wilfred Bion.

Continuing development of Freud's views
In the closing decade of Freud's life, it has been suggested, his view of the death drive changed somewhat, with "the stress much more upon the death instinct's manifestations outwards". Given "the ubiquity of non-erotic aggressivity and destructiveness", he wrote in 1930, "I adopt the standpoint, therefore, that the inclination to aggression is an original, self-subsisting instinctual disposition in man".

In 1933, he conceived of his original formulation of the death drive 'the improbability of our speculations. A queer instinct, indeed, directed to the destruction of its own organic home!'. He wrote moreover that "Our hypothesis is that there are two essentially different classes of instincts: the sexual instincts, understood in the widest sense—Eros, if you prefer that name—and the aggressive instincts, whose aim is destruction". In 1937, he went so far as to suggest privately that 'We should have a neat schematic picture if we supposed that originally, at the beginning of life, all libido was directed to the inside and all aggressiveness to the outside'. In his last writings, it was the contrast of "two basic instincts, Eros and the destructive instinct ... our two primal instincts, Eros and destructiveness", on which he laid stress. Nevertheless, his belief in "the death instinct ... [as] a return to an earlier state ... into an inorganic state" continued to the end.

Mortido and Destrudo
The terms mortido and destrudo, formed analogously to libido, refer to the energy of the death instinct. In the early 21st century, their use amongst Freudian psychoanalysists has been waning, but still designate destructive energy. The importance of integrating mortido into an individual's life, as opposed to splitting it off and disowning it, has been taken up by figures like Robert Bly in the men's movement.

Paul Federn used the term mortido for the new energy source, and has generally been followed in that by other analytic writers. His disciple and collaborator Weiss, however, chose destrudo, which was later taken up by Charles Brenner.

Mortido has also been applied in contemporary expositions of the Cabbala.

Whereas Freud himself never named the aggressive and destructive energy of the death drive (as he had done with the life drive, "libido"), the next generation of psychoanalysts vied to find suitable names for it.

Literary criticism has been almost more prepared than psychoanalysis to make at least metaphorical use of the term 'Destrudo'. Artistic images were seen by Joseph Campbell in terms of "incestuous 'libido' and patricidal 'destrudo'"; while literary descriptions of the conflict between destrudo and libido are still fairly widespread in the 21st century.

Destrudo as an evocative name also appears in rock music and video games.

Paul Federn
Mortido was introduced by Freud's pupil Paul Federn to cover the psychic energy of the death instinct, something left open by Freud himself: Providing what he saw as clinical proof of the reality of the death instinct in 1930, Federn reported on the self-destructive tendencies of severely melancholic patients as evidence of what he would later call inwardly-directed mortido.

However, Freud himself favoured neither term – mortido or destrudo. This worked against either of them gaining widespread popularity in the psychoanalytic literature.

Edoardo Weiss
Destrudo is a term introduced by Italian psychoanalyst Edoardo Weiss in 1935 to denote the energy of the death instinct, on the analogy of libido—and thus to cover the energy of the destructive impulse in Freudian psychology.

Destrudo is the opposite of libido—the urge to create, an energy that arises from the Eros (or "life") drive—and is the urge to destroy arising from Thanatos (death), and thus an aspect of what Sigmund Freud termed "the aggressive instincts, whose aim is destruction".

Weiss related aggression/destrudo to secondary narcissism, something generally only described in terms of the libido turning towards the self.

Eric Berne

Eric Berne, who was a pupil of Federn's, made extensive use of the term mortido in his pre-transactional analysis study, The Mind in Action (1947). As he wrote in the foreword to the third edition of 1967, "the historical events of the last thirty years...become much clearer by introducing Paul Federn's concept of mortido".

Berne saw mortido as activating such forces as hate and cruelty, blinding anger and social hostilities; and considered that inwardly directed mortido underlay the phenomena of guilt and self-punishment, as well as their clinical exacerbations in the form of depression or melancholia.

Berne saw sexual acts as gratifying mortido at the same time as libido; and recognised that on occasion the former becomes more important sexually than the latter, as in sadomasochism and destructive emotional relationships.

Berne's concern with the role of mortido in individuals and groups, social formations and nations, arguably continued throughout all his later writings.

Jean Laplanche
Jean Laplanche has explored repeatedly the question of mortido, and of how far a distinctive instinct of destruction can be identified in parallel to the forces of libido.

Analytic reception
As Freud wryly commented in 1930, "The assumption of the existence of an instinct of death or destruction has met with resistance even in analytic circles". Indeed, Ernest Jones would comment of Beyond the Pleasure Principle that the book not only "displayed a boldness of speculation that was unique in all his writings" but was "further noteworthy in being the only one of Freud's which has received little acceptance on the part of his followers".

Otto Fenichel in his compendious survey of the first Freudian half-century concluded that "the facts on which Freud based his concept of a death instinct in no way necessitate the assumption ... of a genuine self-destructive instinct". Heinz Hartmann set the tone for ego psychology when he "chose to ... do without 'Freud's other, mainly biologically oriented set of hypotheses of the "life" and "death instincts"'". In the object relations theory, among the independent group 'the most common repudiation was the loathsome notion of the death instinct'. Indeed, "for most analysts Freud's idea of a primitive urge towards death, of a primary masochism, was ... bedevilled by problems".

Nevertheless, the concept has been defended, extended, and carried forward by some analysts, generally those tangential to the psychoanalytic mainstream; while among the more orthodox, arguably of "those who, in contrast to most other analysts, take Freud's doctrine of the death drive seriously, K. R. Eissler has been the most persuasive—or least unpersuasive".

Melanie Klein and her immediate followers considered that "the infant is exposed from birth to the anxiety stirred up by the inborn polarity of instincts—the immediate conflict between the life instinct and the death instinct"; and Kleinians indeed built much of their theory of early childhood around the outward deflection of the latter. "This deflection of the death instinct, described by Freud, in Melanie Klein's view consists partly of a projection, partly of the conversion of the death instinct into aggression".

French psychoanalyst Jacques Lacan, for his part, castigated the "refusal to accept this culminating point of Freud's doctrine ... by those who conduct their analysis on the basis of a conception of the ego ... that death instinct whose enigma Freud propounded for us at the height of his experience". Characteristically, he stressed the linguistic aspects of the death drive: "the symbol is substituted for death in order to take possession of the first swelling of life .... There is therefore no further need to have recourse to the outworn notion of primordial masochism in order to understand the reason for the repetitive games in ... his Fort! and in his Da!."

Eric Berne too would proudly proclaim that he, "besides having repeated and confirmed the conventional observations of Freud, also believes right down the line with him concerning the death instinct, and the pervasiveness of the repetition compulsion".

For the twenty-first century, "the death drive today ... remains a highly controversial theory for many psychoanalysts ... [almost] as many opinions as there are psychoanalysts".

Freud's conceptual opposition of death and eros drives in the human psyche was applied by Walter A. Davis in Deracination: Historicity, Hiroshima, and the Tragic Imperative and Death's Dream Kingdom: The American Psyche since 9/11. Davis described social reactions to both Hiroshima and 9/11 from the Freudian viewpoint of the death force. Unless they consciously take responsibility for the damage of those reactions, Davis claims that Americans will repeat them.

See also

References

Further reading
 Otto Fenichel, "A Critique of the Death Instinct" (1935), in Collected Papers, 1st Series (1953), 363–72.
 K. R. Eissler, "Death Drive, Ambivalence, and Narcissism", The Psychoanalytic Study of the Child, XXVI (1971), 25–78.
 Paul Federn, Ego Psychology and the Psychoses (1952)
 Jean Laplanche, Vie et Mort en Psychanalyse (1970)
 Rob Weatherill, The death drive: new life for a dead subject? (1999).
 Niklas Hageback, The Death Drive: Why Societies Self-Destruct Gaudium; Reprint edition. (2020). .
 Edoardo Weiss, Principles of Psychodynamics (New York 1950)

External links 

"Death Instincts" ;
"Nirvana Principle";
"Compulsion to Repeat" ("Repetition compulsion").
 Bernard Golse, "Destrudo" 

Death
Energy and instincts
Psychoanalytic terminology
Freudian psychology
1910s neologisms
Thanatos

fr:Pulsions (psychanalyse)#Pulsions de vie et de mort
it:Pulsione di morte